Bad Religion (also referred to as The Bad Religion EP) is the first official recording by the Los Angeles punk rock band Bad Religion. It was released in February 1981 by guitarist Brett Gurewitz's record label Epitaph Records, with the catalog number EPI 001.

Recording
The recording sessions for the EP took place in October 1980 at a demo studio called Studio 9, located above an office and drugstore in Los Angeles on Sunset Boulevard and Western Avenue. The EP was mastered by Stan Ross at Gold Star Studios in Hollywood. At the time of the EP's release, vocalist Greg Graffin and bassist Jay Bentley were both 16 years old, while Gurewitz and drummer Jay Ziskrout were both 18.

Reissues
The Bad Religion EP has been reissued a number of times, mostly on vinyl. It was initially released on 7-inch vinyl, and reissued in 1984 as a 12-inch with a different sound mix. In West Germany, a 7" bootleg limited edition of the EP was released in 1989, packaged with then-current album No Control. The EP was also pressed on compact cassettes, but those editions are rare. While the Bad Religion EP has never been released as a standalone CD, it was included on the 1991 compilation album 80–85, and on the 2004 CD reissue of the group's 1982 debut studio album How Could Hell Be Any Worse?, which featured the same track listing as 80–85. The EP was reissued on April 18, 2009 in conjunction with Record Store Day, in a limited edition of 1,000.

Reception

At the time of the original release, the Bad Religion EP received positive reviews from various fanzines. Brenda Jamrus of the punk rock magazine Ripper called the EP "a real powerful six song EP from Bad Religion". She added that "when so many bands are moving away from political overtones, these four guys are keeping politics alive" and described the songs as "fast and solid".

Dave Stimson reviewed the EP for the 16th issue of Touch and Go. In it, he said, "Unlike many LA based bands where all it takes is one listen and you're already dripping slobber on the floor, Bad Religion takes some time before winning over their legion of fans, which must be many cuz [sic] this is a great record. When you first hear it, you say same old LA-styled punk, good, but nothing to get excited about. Now that's where you're wrong. This is perhaps the best debut record since Nervous Breakdown. I can't quite put my finger on it...something like Black Flag meets Neg Trend".

Track listing

Personnel
 Greg Graffin - lead vocals
 Brett Gurewitz - guitar
 Jay Bentley - bass
 Jay Ziskrout - drums

Production
 Bad Religion; Big Dick - producers
 Stan Ross - mastering
 Brett Gurewitz - engineering
 Gary Leonard - photography

References

Bad Religion EPs
Epitaph Records EPs
1981 debut EPs